Daniel Seguin (born June 7, 1948) is a Canadian former professional ice hockey player who played 37 games in the National Hockey League for the Vancouver Canucks and Minnesota North Stars between 1970 and 1974. He also played several years in the minor Central Hockey League, Western Hockey League, and American Hockey League, in a professional career that last from 1968 to 1977. 

His son, Brett, was selected by the Los Angeles Kings in the 1991 NHL Entry Draft, but never played in the NHL.

Career statistics

Regular season and playoffs

References

External links 

1948 births
Living people
Canadian ice hockey left wingers
EV Landshut players
Ice hockey people from Ontario
Iowa Stars (CHL) players
Kitchener Rangers players
Memphis South Stars players
Minnesota North Stars players
Rhode Island Reds players
Rochester Americans players
Seattle Totems (CHL) players
Seattle Totems (WHL) players
Sportspeople from Greater Sudbury
Tulsa Oilers (1964–1984) players
Vancouver Canucks players